Gerhard Friedrich Müller (Russian: Фёдор Ива́нович Ми́ллер, Fyodor Ivanovich Miller, 29 October 1705 – 22 October 1783) was a Russian-German historian and pioneer ethnologist.

Early life
Müller was born in Herford and educated at Leipzig. In 1725, he was invited to St. Petersburg to co-found the Imperial Academy of Sciences.

Career 
Müller participated in the second Kamchatka expedition, which reported on life and nature of the further (eastern) side of the Ural mountain range. From 1733 until 1743, nineteen scientists and artists traveled through Siberia to study people, cultures and collected data for the creation of maps. Müller, who described and categorized clothing, religions and rituals of the Siberian ethnic groups, is considered to be the father of ethnography.

On his return from Siberia, he became historiographer to the Russian Empire. He was one of the first historians to bring out a general account of Russian history based on an extensive examination of the documentary sources. His accentuation of the role of Scandinavians and Germans in the history of that country – a germ of the so-called Normanist theory – earned him enmity of Mikhail Lomonosov, who had previously supported his work, and dented his Russian career.

In the early 1760s he rediscovered the List of Russian Cities, Near and Far, after which his colleague August Ludwig von Schlözer published in Russian in 1816.

In 1766, after many attacks by his colleagues, Müller was appointed keeper of the national archives. He drew up for the government a collection of its treatises.

Later life 
In 1761, Müller was elected a foreign member of the Royal Swedish Academy of Sciences. He died, aged 77, in Moscow.

See also
List of Russian historians

References 
 Kerstin Holm, Stuttgarter Zeitung, No. 303 (29 December 2005), p. 38.
 
 "М. Н. Тихомиров. Список русских городов дальних и ближних" [M. N. Tikhomirov. List of Russian cities, near and far]. litopys.org.ua (in Russian). Retrieved 2022-05-17.

Further reading 
 Joseph Lawrence Black, G.F. Müller and the Imperial Russian Academy of Sciences, 1725-1783: First Steps in the Development of the Historical Sciences in Russia. Kingston-Montréal: McGill-Queen's University Press, 1986.
 Joseph Lawrence Black and Dieter K. Buse, G.-F. Müller and Siberia, 1733-1743. With translations of German materials by Victoria Joan Moessner. Kingston, Ontario/Fairbanks, Alaska: Limestone Press (Russia and Asia Series 1), 1989.
 Aleksander Christianovich Elert, Ekspedicionnye materialy G. F. Millera kak istocnik po istorii Sibiri [Expedition Materials of G.F. Müller as Sources for the History of Siberia]. Novosibirsk, 1990.  
 Gudrun Bucher, "Von Beschreibung der Sitten und Gebräuche der Völcker": Die Instruktionen Gerhard Friedrich Müllers und ihre Bedeutung für die Geschichte der Ethnologie und der Geschichtswissenschaft. Stuttgart: Franz Steiner Verlag (Quellen und Studien zur Geschichte des östlichen Europa 63), 2002.
 
 Claus Priesner, Müller, Gerhard Friedrich von. Neue Deutsche Biographie (NDB) 18 (1997), S. 394 f. On-line edition: http://www.deutsche-biographie.de/pnd118953362.html 
 Peter Hoffmann, Gerhard Friedrich Müller (1705-1783): Historiker, Geograph, Archivar im Dienste Russlands. Frankfurt am Main: Peter Lang, 2005.
 Gerard Fridrich Miller [Gerhard Friedrich Müller], Opisanie sibirskich narodov. [Beschreibung sibirischer Völker]. Edited by Aleksandr Christianovich Elert and Wieland Hintzsche. Moskva: Pamjatniki Istoricheskoj Mysli (Quellen zur Geschichte Sibiriens und Alaskas aus russischen Archiven Band VIII/1), 2009.
 Gerhard Friedrich Müller, Ethnographische Schriften I. Bearbeitet von Wieland Hintzsche und Aleksandr Christianovich Elert unter Mitarbeit von Heike Heklau. Halle: Verlag der Franckeschen Stiftungen zu Halle, Harrassowitz Verlag in Kommission (Quellen zur Geschichte Sibiriens und Alaskas aus russischen Archiven VIII), 2010. . Band I: Beschreibung der sibirischen Völker [ca. 1736-1747].
 Han F. Vermeulen: 'Ethnography and Empire: G. F. Müller and the Description of Siberian Peoples'. In: Han F. Vermeulen: Before Boas: The Genesis of Ethnography and Ethnology in the German Enlightenment. Lincoln & London, University of Nebraska Press, 2015.

External links 

 

German emigrants to the Russian Empire
Explorers from the Russian Empire
German ethnographers
1705 births
1783 deaths
Full members of the Saint Petersburg Academy of Sciences
Members of the Royal Swedish Academy of Sciences
People from Herford
Fellows of the Royal Society
Leipzig University alumni
18th-century explorers
18th-century scientists from the Russian Empire
Explorers of Siberia
Great Northern Expedition
Writers about Russia
Historians of Russia